Acraea aurivillii, the large alciope acraea, is a butterfly in the family Nymphalidae. It is found in Sierra Leone, Liberia, Ivory Coast, Ghana, Nigeria, Cameroon, Gabon, the Republic of the Congo, the Central African Republic, the Democratic Republic of the Congo, Burundi, Uganda, Kenya, Tanzania, Zambia and Ethiopia. The habitat consists of forests.

The larvae feed on Laportea podocarpa, Urera flamigniana, Urera gravenreuthii, Urera thonneri, Pouzolzia denudata, Urera hypselodendron and Adenia species.

Subspecies
Acraea aurivillii aurivillii (Sierra Leone, Liberia, Ivory Coast, Ghana, Nigeria, Cameroon, Gabon, Congo, Central African Republic, southern and eastern Democratic Republic of the Congo, Burundi, Uganda, western Kenya, north-western Tanzania, Zambia)
Acraea aurivillii schecana Rothschild & Jordan, 1905 (south-western Ethiopia)

Similar species
Acraea alciope q.v. for differences

Taxonomy
It is a member of the Acraea jodutta  species group    -   but see also Pierre & Bernaud, 2014

Etymology
The name honours the Swedish entomologist Per Olof Christopher Aurivillius.

References

External links

Die Gross-Schmetterlinge der Erde 13: Die Afrikanischen Tagfalter. Plate XIII 57 e 
Images representing Acraea aurivillii at Bold

Butterflies described in 1896
aurivillii
Butterflies of Africa